Chris Sinclair (born 11 November 1970) is a former professional footballer who played as a winger.

Early and personal life
His father Jackie and uncle Willie Sinclair were also professional footballers, as were his father's uncle Tommy Wright, Sr. and cousin Tommy Wright Jr.

Career
After playing youth football with Sauchie Athletic, Sinclair began his senior career at Dunfermline Athletic, making 34 league appearances between 1989 and 1994. Sinclair's next club was Meadowbank Thistle, but he moved along with the club when it relocated to Livingston in 1995. In total he made 49 league appearances over three seasons. Sinclair's final club was Albion Rovers, where he spent a further two seasons, making 34 league appearances.

References

1970 births
Living people
Footballers from Sheffield
English footballers
English people of Scottish descent
Dunfermline Athletic F.C. players
Livingston F.C. players
Albion Rovers F.C. players
Scottish Football League players
Association football wingers